There's Something Going On is the second studio album by the rock band Babybird, released in 1998. Unlike the band's previous album, Ugly Beautiful, only one of the tracks is an alternative version of an original recording made by lead singer, Stephen Jones, before the band was formed. The original version of "I Was Never Here" can be heard on Fatherhood.

The album peaked at No. 28 on the UK Albums Chart.

Critical reception
The Irish Times wrote that "Baby Bird's mix of sweet pop and sour grapes is not always palatable, but sometimes it's a welcome tonic for jaded Britpoppers." Spin deemed it "bittersweetly twisted."

The album was voted No. 14 in NME's albums of the year for 1998.

Track listing
 "Bad Old Man" – 4:35
 "If You'll Be Mine" – 4:40
 "Back Together" – 4:26
 "I Was Never Here" – 5:06
 "First Man on the Sun" – 3:44
 "You Will Always Love Me" – 3:56
 "The Life" – 5:17
 "All Men Are Evil" – 4:01
 "Take Me Back" – 6:05
 "It's Not Funny Anymore" – 7:10
 "There's Something Going On" – 2:28

Charts

References

Babybird albums
1998 albums
The Echo Label albums